Penny's Bay Quarantine Centre is a designated quarantine facility in Hong Kong.

History
Construction began in February 2020 and Phase 1A was completed on 17 April 2020. The site was previously part of the Hong Kong Disneyland Resort, where a second theme park would have been constructed.

References

Quarantine
Quarantine facilities designated for the COVID-19 pandemic
Quarantine facilities